Sachin Jayawardena (born 12 November 1994) is a Sri Lankan cricketer. He made his first-class debut for Bloomfield Cricket and Athletic Club in the 2013–14 Premier Trophy on 21 March 2014.

References

External links
 

1994 births
Living people
Sri Lankan cricketers
Anuradhaura District cricketers
Bloomfield Cricket and Athletic Club cricketers
Cricketers from Colombo